Tippett Studio is an American visual effects company specializing in computer-generated imagery (CGI) for films and television commercials. The studio has created visual effects and animations on over fifty feature films and commercials, garnering an Academy Award, four Clio Awards and two Emmy Awards.

History
Tippett Studio was founded in 1984 by Phil Tippett and Jules Roman, Phil's wife and the president of the company. The studio began as a stop motion animation company (by means of its particular stop motion animation variant, the so-called go motion animation technique). It also designed and built live action props for films, such as RoboCop, RoboCop 2, Honey, I Shrunk the Kids and Ghost. In 1991, the studio shifted its focus to computer-generated imagery to work on Jurassic Park, (released in 1993, with Industrial Light and Magic) by developing the Digital Input Device (DID). The DID was a new effects technology which placed computer-linked sensors into the moving joints of three-dimensional, articulated character models. This system earned Craig Hayes a Scientific and Technical Achievement Academy Award and the work on Jurassic Park earned the studio an Oscar. Creature animation work for Coneheads (also released in 1993) was the last go motion puppet project done by this company.

The studio also worked on Blockbuster commercials featuring Ray and Carl, a guinea pig and rabbit at a pet store window from 2002 to 2007 during the Super Bowl.

Paul Verhoeven's 1997 film Starship Troopers became at the time Tippett Studio's biggest project, with over 500 effects shots, for which the company received another Academy Award nomination. Phil Tippett co-directed the large-scale battle sequences with Verhoeven. The studio doubled in size to digitally animate and composite hundreds of creature shots for the film.

Early in 2000, the studio re-teamed with Paul Verhoeven on Hollow Man. Craig Hayes co-supervised the creation of the invisible Sebastian whose outline becomes visible in steam, rain, water and even blood. The outstanding visual effects were recognized with another Academy Award nomination.

Motion picture filmography
 1984 Prehistoric Beast
 1984 Caravan of Courage: An Ewok Adventure
 1985 Dinosaur!
 1985 Ewoks: The Battle for Endor
 1986 Howard the Duck (alongside Industrial Light & Magic)
 1986 The Golden Child
 1987 RoboCop
 1988 Willow (alongside Industrial Light & Magic)
 1989 Ghostbusters II (alongside Industrial Light & Magic)
 1989 Honey, I Shrunk the Kids
 1990 RoboCop 2
 1993 Coneheads
 1993 Jurassic Park (alongside Industrial Light & Magic)
 1993 RoboCop 3
 1995 Three Wishes
 1996 Dragonheart
 1996 Tremors 2: Aftershocks
 1997 Starship Troopers
 1998 Armageddon
 1998 Practical Magic
 1999 Bicentennial Man
 1999 Komodo
 1999 My Favorite Martian
 1999 The Haunting
 1999 Virus
 2000 Hollow Man
 2000 Mission to Mars
 2001 Cats & Dogs
 2001 Evolution
 2001 The One
 2002 Blade II
 2002 Men in Black II (alongside Industrial Light & Magic)
 2002 The Ring
 2002 The Santa Clause 2
 2003 The League of Extraordinary Gentlemen
 2003 The Matrix Revolutions
 2004 Catwoman
 2004 Hellboy
 2004 Starship Troopers 2: Hero of the Federation
 2004 The Stepford Wives
 2005 Constantine
 2005 Son of the Mask
 2005 The Adventures of Shark Boy and Lava Girl in 3-D
 2006 Charlotte's Web
 2006 Santa Clause 3
 2006 The Shaggy Dog
 2007 Enchanted
 2007 The Golden Compass
 2008 Cloverfield
 2008 The Spiderwick Chronicles (alongside Industrial Light & Magic)
 2008 Beverly Hills Chihuahua
 2008 Bedtime Stories
 2009 Drag Me to Hell
 2009 The Twilight Saga: New Moon
 2010 Cats & Dogs: The Revenge of Kitty Galore
 2010 The Twilight Saga: Eclipse
 2011 Immortals
 2011 Piranha 3D
 2011 Priest
 2011 Season of the Witch
 2011 The Smurfs
 2011 The Twilight Saga: Breaking Dawn – Part 1
 2012 Hemingway & Gellhorn
 2012 Ted
 2012 The Twilight Saga: Breaking Dawn – Part 2
 2013 After Earth
 2013 Horns
 2014 A Million Ways to Die in the West
 2014 Cosmos: A Spacetime Odyssey
 2014 Transformers: Age of Extinction
 2014 Deliver Us from Evil
 2014 Teenage Mutant Ninja Turtles
 2014 The Crossing
 2014 The Pyramid
 2014 The Remaining
 2015 Jurassic World
 2015 Star Wars: The Force Awakens 
 2016 Gods of Egypt
 2016 League of Gods
 2017 - present The Orville (TV series)
 2018 Solo: A Star Wars Story
 2018 Mad God: Part 3 (animation short)
 2019 Star Wars: Episode IX - The Rise of Skywalker (alongside Industrial Light & Magic)
 2019 Crazy Alien 2021 The Falcon and the Winter Soldier 2021 Mad God 2022 Black Adam

Awards and nominations

Film
 2000: Hollow Man – Academy Award nomination - Best Visual Effects
 1997: Starship Troopers – Academy Award nomination – Best Visual Effects
 1995: Dragonheart – Academy Award nomination – Best Visual Effects
 1993: Jurassic Park – Academy Award – Best Visual Effects
 1988: Willow – Academy Award nomination – Best Visual Effects
 1985: Ewoks: The Battle for Endor – Primetime Emmy Award – Outstanding Special Visual Effects
 1985: Dinosaur!'' – Primetime Emmy Award – Outstanding Special Visual Effects

Commercials
 2002: Blockbuster Video, Carl & Ray: Kung Fu – Clio Award, Gold – Computer Animation
 2002: Blockbuster Video, Carl & Ray: Gotta Dance – Clio Award, Bronze – Computer Animation
 2002: Blockbuster Video, Carl & Ray: Prima Donna – Clio Award, Bronze – Computer Animation
 2002: Blockbuster Video, Carl & Ray: Kung Fu – Clio Award, Bronze – Visual Effects

References

External links
 Tippett Studio

American animation studios
Visual effects companies
Companies based in Berkeley, California
Best Visual Effects Academy Award winners
American companies established in 1984
1984 establishments in California